Maurice Edward Dockrell (6 October 1908 – 9 December 1986) was an Irish Fine Gael politician who was elected to Dáil Éireann at ten successive general elections, serving as a Teachta Dála (TD) for thirty-four years. He has been described as "a protestant with a unionist pedigree".

The second son of Henry Morgan Dockrell, he was born on 6 October 1908 at 1 Herbert Park, Dublin. He was educated at St Andrew's College, Dublin; and Trinity College Dublin, where he graduated with a Bachelor of Commerce in 1930. In the same year became a director of Thomas Dockrell, Sons & Co. On his father's death in 1955 he assumed the position of chairman and managing director.

He was elected to Dáil Éireann as a Fine Gael TD for the Dublin South constituency at the 1943 general election, and re-elected at the 1944 general election.

After constituency boundaries were redrawn in 1947, Dockrell was returned at the 1948 general election for the Dublin South-Central constituency, which re-elected him on five further elections. He was then elected twice as a TD for Dublin Central, at the 1969 and 1973 general elections. He stood for Dublin South-Central at the 1977 general election but lost his seat in the Fianna Fáil landslide of that year.

From 1960 to 1961, he was the Lord Mayor of Dublin. During his term of office he raised the hackles of some protestants when, in a gesture of ecumenism, he kissed the ring of the papal legate to the Patrician celebrations in June 1961. Always keen to build bridges between Ireland and Britain, he paid an official visit to London in June 1961, when he laid a wreath at The Cenotaph, a gesture later described in his Times obituary as ‘an act of piety that involved some political risk’.

His father, Henry Morgan Dockrell, and his brother, H. Percy Dockrell were also Fine Gael TDs. His grandfather, Sir Maurice Dockrell, had been a Unionist MP before independence.

His son Henry Morgan Dockrell was elected to Dublin City Council in 1967. His grandson Maurice Dockrell was co-opted onto Dún Laoghaire–Rathdown County Council in 2020, making him the fifth generation of the family to serve either at national or local level.

During a 1975 debate on reform of the country's conservative laws against contraceptives, he is alleged to have said "I'm for it, but I'm past it".

See also
Families in the Oireachtas

References

 

1908 births
1986 deaths
Fine Gael TDs
Irish Anglicans
Lord Mayors of Dublin
Members of the 11th Dáil
Members of the 12th Dáil
Members of the 13th Dáil
Members of the 14th Dáil
Members of the 15th Dáil
Members of the 16th Dáil
Members of the 17th Dáil
Members of the 18th Dáil
Members of the 19th Dáil
Members of the 20th Dáil
Presidential appointees to the Council of State (Ireland)
People educated at St Andrew's College, Dublin
Alumni of Trinity College Dublin